The following were component companies of the Canadian National Railways in 1962, or predecessors of such companies:


A
Acadia Coal Company
Addison Railroad
Alberta and Great Waterways Railway
Alberta Midland Railway
Albert Railway
Alexander Gibson Railway and Manufacturing Company
American Union Telegraph Company
Amherst and Belchertown Railroad
Amherst, Belchertown and Palmer Railroad
Anglo-American Telegraph Company
Annapolis and Atlantic Railway
Atlantic and Lake Superior Railway
Atlantic and St. Lawrence Railroad
Atlantic, Quebec and Western Railway
Autoport Limited
Aquatrain

B
Baie des Chaleurs Railway
Barre Granite Railway
Bay City Terminal Railway
Bay of Chaleurs Railway
Bay of Quinte Railway and Navigation Company
Bay of Quinte Railway
Beauharnois Junction Railway
Belleville and North Hastings Railway
Belt Railway of Chicago
Bessborough Hotel
Bessemer and Barry's Bay Railway
Bethel Granite Railway
Brantford and Buffalo Joint Stock Railroad
Brantford, Norfolk and Port Burwell Railway
Brattleboro and Fitchburg Railroad
Brattleboro and Whitehall Railroad
British and American Express Company
British and North American Express Company
Brockville, Westport and North-Western Railway
Brockville and Westport Railway
Brockville, Westport and Sault Ste. Marie Railway
Brooksay Realty Company
Buctouche and Moncton Branch Railway
Buctouche and Moncton Railway
Buctouche and Northumberland Strait Railway
Buctouche Railway and Transportation Company
Buffalo and Lake Huron Railway
Buffalo, Brantford and Goderich Railway
Bulkley and Telkwa Valley Coal Company
Burk's Falls and French River Railway
Burlington and Lamoille Railroad
Burlington and Lamoille Valley Railroad
Burrard Inlet Tunnel and Bridge Company

C
Canada Air Line Railway
Canada Atlantic Railway
Canada Atlantic Transit Company
Canada Atlantic Transit Company of U.S.
Canada Eastern Railway
Canada, New Brunswick and Nova Scotia Railway
Canadian Airways
Canadian Express Company
Canadian Government Merchant Marine
Canadian Government Railways
Canadian Government Railways Employees' Relief and Insurance Association
Canadian - Minnesota Bridge Company
Canadian National Electric Railways
Canadian National Express Company
Canadian National Hotels
Canadian National Land Settlement Association
Canadian National Lines - Niagara Frontier - New York
Canadian National Railway
Canadian National Railways - Eastern Lines
Canadian National Railways (France)
Canadian National Railways Pension Fund - 1929
Canadian National Railways Pension Fund - 1935
Canadian National Railways Radio
Canadian National Railways Securities Trust
Canadian National Railways Trust Company
Canadian National Realties
Canadian National Rolling Stock
Canadian National Steamship Company
Canadian National Telegraph Company
Canadian National Transfer Company
Canadian National Transportation
Canadian National (West Indies) Steamships
Canadian Northern Alberta Railway
Canadian Northern Branch Lines Company
Canadian Northern Coal and Ore Dock Company
Canadian Northern Consolidated Railways
Canadian Northern Express Company
Canadian Northern Manitoba Railway
Canadian Northern Montreal Tunnel and Terminal Company
Canadian Northern Ontario Railway
Canadian Northern Pacific Railway
Canadian Northern Quebec Railway
Canadian Northern Railway Arbitration Award
Canadian Northern Railway
Canadian Northern Railway Express Company
Canadian Northern Realties
Canadian Northern Rolling Stock
Canadian Northern Saskatchewan Railway
Canadian Northern Steamships
Canadian Northern System Terminals (Limited)
Canadian Northern Telegraph Company
Canadian Northern Transfer Company
Canadian Northern Western Railway
Canadian Yukon Railway
Cannar Oils
Canso and Louisburg Railway
Cape Breton Railway, Coal and Iron Company
Cape Breton Railway
Cape Breton Railway Extension Company
Caraquet and Gulf Shore Railway
Caraquet Railway
Carillon and Grenville Railway
Centmont Corporation
Central Canada Express Company
Central Canada Railway
Central Counties Railway
Central Ontario Railway
Central Railway Limited, (N.S.)
Central Vermont Airways Incorporated
Central Vermont Railroad
Central Vermont Railway
Central Vermont Railway Incorporated
Central Vermont Terminal Incorporated
Central Vermont Transit Corporation
Central Vermont Transportation Company
Central Vermont Warehouse Incorporated
Champlain and Connecticut River Railroad
Champlain and St. Lawrence Railroad
Champlain and St. Lawrence Railroad (New York)
Charlottetown Hotel
Chateauguay and Northern Railway
Chateau Laurier Hotel
Chatham Branch Railway
Chatham Railway
Cheney, Rice and Company
Chicago, Detroit and Canada Grand Trunk Junction Railroad
Chicago and Grand Trunk Railway
Chicago, Kalamazoo and Saginaw Railway
Chicago and Kalamazoo Terminal Railroad
Chicago Lake County Railway
Chicago and Lake Huron Railroad
Chicago, New York and Boston Refrigerator Company
Chicago and North Eastern Railroad
Chicago and Southern Railroad
Chicago and State Line Extension Railway
Chicago and State Line Railway
Chicago and Western Indiana Belt Railway
Chicago and Western Indiana Railroad
Cincinnati, Saginaw and Mackinaw Railroad
City and Suburban Electric Railway
Clarke Steamship Company
Coast Railway of Nova Scotia
Cobourg, Blairton and Marmora Railway and Mining Company
Cobourg, Peterborough and Marmora Railway and Mining Company
Cobourg and Peterborough Railway
Cobourg Railroad
Company of Proprietors of the Champlain and St. Lawrence Railroad
Consolidated Land Corporation
Consolidated Railroad of Vermont
Continental Realty and Holding Company
Coteau and Province Line Railway and Bridge Company
Crosby Transportation Company

D
Dalhousie Navigation Company
Davenport Street Railway
Detroit Belt Railroad
Detroit, Grand Haven and Milwaukee Railway
Detroit and Huron Railway
Detroit and Huron Railway
Detroit and Milwaukee Railroad
Detroit and Milwaukee Railway
Detroit and Pontiac Railroad
Detroit Terminal Railroad
Detroit and Toledo Shore Line Railroad
Digby and Annapolis Railway
Dominion Telegraph Company
Dominion Telegraph Securities
Drummond County Railway
Duluth, Rainy Lake and Winnipeg Railway
Duluth, Virginia and Rainy Lake Railway
Duluth and Virginia Realty Company
Duluth, Winnipeg and Pacific Railroad
Duluth, Winnipeg and Pacific Railway

E
East Richelieu Valley Railway
East-West Transport
Eastern Extension Railway
Eastern Lands Department
Eastern Transport
Edmonton District Railway
Edmonton, Dunvegan and British Columbia Railway
Edmonton and Slave Lake Railway
Edmonton, Yukon and Pacific Railway
Elgin and Havelock Railway
Elgin, Petitcodiac and Havelock Railway
Empire Coal and Mining Company
Empire Freightways
Erie, London and Tillsonburg Railway
European and North American Railway

F
Federal Properties
Fenelon Falls Railway
Flos Tramway Company
Fort Garry Hotel
Fredericton and Saint Mary's Bridge Company
Fredericton and Saint Mary's Railway Bridge Company

G
Galt and Guelph Railway
Gananoque, Perth and James Bay Railway
Gananoque and Rideau Railway
Gaspe Lines
Georgian Bay and Wellington Railway
Grand Haven and Milwaukee Transportation Company
Grand Junction Railroad
Grand Junction Railway of Canada
Grand Junction Railway
Grand Rapids Terminal Railroad
Grand Trunk Car Ferry Line
Grand Trunk Fire Brigade
Grand Trunk, Georgian Bay and Lake Erie Railway
Grand Trunk Junction Railway
Grand Trunk Milwaukee Car Ferry Company
Grand Trunk Pacific Alaska Steamship Company
Grand Trunk Pacific Branch Lines Company
Grand Trunk Pacific Coast Steamship Company
Grand Trunk Pacific Development Company
Grand Trunk Pacific Dock Company of Seattle
Grand Trunk Pacific Railway
Grand Trunk Pacific Saskatchewan Railway
Grand Trunk Pacific Telegraph Company
Grand Trunk Pacific Terminal Elevator Company (Limited)
Grand Trunk Pacific Town and Development Company
Grand Trunk - Pennsylvania Transportation Company
Grand Trunk Pension Fund
Grand Trunk Radio Communications
Grand Trunk Railway of Canada
Grand Trunk Railway Acquisition
Grand Trunk Railway of Canada East
Grand Trunk Railway Fire Brigade
Grand Trunk Railway Insurance and Provident Society
Grand Trunk Railway Literary and Scientific Institute
Grand Trunk Railway of Canada Superannuation and Provident Fund
Grand Trunk Railway Regiment
Grand Trunk Terminal Warehousing Company
Grand Trunk Western Railroad
Grand Trunk Western Railway
Granville and Victoria Beach Railway and Development Company
Great American and European Short Line Railway
Great Eastern Railway
Great Northern Elevator Company
Great Northern Construction Company
Great Northern Railway of Canada
Great Northern Western Telegraph Company of Canada
Great Western Railway
Gulf Shore Railway

H
Halifax and Cape Breton Railway and Coal Company
Halifax and Eastern Railway
Halifax and Guysborough Railway
Halifax and South Western Railway
Halifax and Yarmouth Railway
Hamilton and Lake Erie Railway
Hamilton and North-Western Railway
Hamilton and Port Dover Railway
Hamilton and South Western Railway
Hamilton and Toronto Railway
Hampton and Saint Martin's Railway
Hoar Transport Company
Harlem Extension Railway
Harvey Elevator Company
Hudson Bay Railway
Huron and Quebec Railway

I
Imperial Rolling Stock Company
Indiana Railway
Industrial Land Company
Intercolonial and Prince Edward Island Railways Employees, Provident Fund
Intercolonial Express Company of Canada, (Limited)
Intercolonial Railway
Intercolonial Railway Windsor Branch
International Bridge Company
International Railway of New Brunswick
Inverness Coal, Iron and Railway
Inverness Coal, Field and Railway
Inverness Railway and Coal Company
Inverness Railway
Inverness - Richmond Collieries and Railway of Canada
Inverness and Richmond Railway
Irondale, Bancroft and Ottawa Railway

J
Jacques Cartier Union Railway
James Bay and Eastern Railway
James Bay Railway
Jasper Park Lodge

K
Kent, Northern Extension Railway
Kent Northern Railway
Kingston, Napanee and Western Railway
Kingston and Toronto Railway
Kingston, Smiths Falls and Ottawa Railway

L
Lachine and Hochelaga Railway
Lachine, Jacques Cartier and Maisonneuve Railway
Lake Manitoba Railway and Canal Company
Lake St. Joseph Hotel Company
Lake St. Louis and Province Line Railway
Lake Simcoe Junction Railway
Lake Superior Branch - Grand Trunk Pacific Railway
Lake Superior Terminals Company
Lakeside Navigation Company (Limited)
Lamoille Valley Extension Railroad
Lawlor Building - Toronto
Lebanon Springs Railroad
Lewiston and Auburn Railroad
Lindsay, Fenelon Falls and Ottawa River Railway
Liverpool and Milton Railway
Liverpool and Milton Tramway Company
London and Gore Railroad
London and Grand Trunk Junction Railway
London, Huron and Bruce Railway
London and Port Sarnia Railway
Lobtiniere and Megantic Railway
Louisburg Extension Railway
Lower Laurentian Railway
Luscar Coals
Luscar Collieries

M
Macdonald Hotel, Edmonton
Maganetawan River Railway
Mackenzie Mann and Company
Malone and St. Lawrence Railway
Manitoba Northern Railway
Manitoba Railway
Manitoba and South Eastern Railway
Market Gardens
Marmora Iron Company
Marmora Railway and Mining Company
Massena Springs and Fort Covington Railroad
Maskinonge and Nipissing Railway
Medonte Tramway Company
Michigan Air Line Railway
Michigan Railway
Middleton and Victoria Beach Railway
Midland Extension Railway
Midland Railway of Canada
Midland Superior Express
Minnesota and Manitoba Railroad
Minnesota and Ontario Bridge Company
Missisquoi Junction Railway
Missisquoi Railroad
Missisquoi Valley Railroad
Moncton and Buctouche Railway
Moncton and Northumberland Strait Railway
Montalta Holdings
Montfort Colonization Railway
Montfort and Gatineau Colonization Railway
Montpelier and White River Railroad
Montreal and Bytown Railway
Montreal and Champlain Junction Railway
Montreal and Champlain Railroad
Montreal and City of Ottawa Junction Railway
Montreal and European Short Line Railway
Montreal and Bytown Railway
Montreal, Chambly and Sorel Railway
Montreal and Champlain Junction Railway
Montreal and Champlain Railroad
Montreal and City of Ottawa Junction Railway
Montreal and European Short Line Railway
Montreal Fruit and Produce Terminal Company
Montreal Island Belt Line Railway
Montreal and Kingston Railroad
Montreal and Kingston Railway
Montreal and Lachine Railroad
Montreal and New York Railroad
Montreal, Portland and Boston Railway
Montreal and Province Line Junction Railway
Montreal and Province Line Railway
Montreal Railway Terminus Company
Montreal and Sorel Railway
Montreal and Southern Counties Railway
Montreal Stock Yards Company
Montreal Telegraph Company
Montreal Terminal Railway
Montreal and Vermont Junction Railway
Montreal Warehousing Company
Morden and North-Western Railway
Mountain Park Coals
Mountain Park Coal Syndicate
Mount Royal Tunnel and Terminal Company
Muskegon Railway and Navigation Company
Musquodoboit Railway

N
Napanee, Tamworth and Quebec Railway
National Construction Company (Limited)
National Terminals of Canada
National Transcontinental Railway
National Transcontinental Railway Branch Lines Company
Nelson Valley Railway and Transportation Company
New Brunswick and Prince Edward Railway
New Brunswick and Prince Edward Island Railway
New England Elevator Company
Newfoundland Hotel
Newfoundland Northern and Western Railway
Newfoundland Railway
Newfoundland Railway Steamship Services
New Glasgow Iron, Coal and Railway
New London Northern Railroad
New London, Willimantic and Palmer Railroad
New London, Willimantic and Springfield Railroad
New Westminster Southern Railway
Niagara and St. Catharines Street Railway
Niagara Falls International Bridge Company
Niagara Falls Suspension Bridge Company
Niagara Falls, Wesley Park and Clifton Tramway Company
Niagara, Hamilton and Pacific Railway
Niagara Lower Arch Bridge Company
Niagara, St. Catharines and Toronto Navigation Company (Limited)
Niagara, St. Catharines and Toronto Railway
Nictaux and Atlantic Railway
Norfolk Railway
North Eastern Railway
North Grey Railway
North Railway
North Shore Railway
North Shore Railway and St. Maurice Navigation Company
North Simcoe Railway
Northern Alberta Railways Company
Northern Consolidated Holding Company
Northern Extension Railway
Northern Extension Railways Company
Northern and North-Western Railway
Northern, North-Western and Sault Ste. Marie Railway
Northern and Pacific Junction Railway
Northern Pacific and Manitoba Railway
Northern Railroad, (N.Y.)
Northern Railway, (N.B.)
Northern Railway of Canada
Northern Townsites
Northumberland Straits Tunnel Railway
North Western Grand Trunk Railway of Illinois and Indiana
North Western Grand Trunk Railway of Michigan
Norway Branch Railroad
Nova Scotia Central Railway
Nova Scotia Eastern Railway
Nova Scotia Iron and Steel Company
Nova Scotia, Nictaux and Atlantic Central Railway
Nova Scotia Railway
Nova Scotia Southern Railway
Nova Scotia Southern Railway
Nova Scotia Steel and Coal Company
Nova Scotia Iron and Steel Company
Nova Scotian Hotel, Halifax

O
Oakland and Ottawa Railroad
Ogdensburg and Lake Champlain Railroad
Ogdensburg Railroad
Omemee, Bobcaygeon and North Peterborough Junction Railway
Ontario, Belmont and Northern Railway
Ontario Car Ferry Company, (Limited)
Ontario and Ottawa Railway
Ontario and Rainy River Railway
Ontario Sault Ste. Marie Railway
Ontario, Simcoe and Huron Railroad Union Company
Oshawa Railway and Navigation Company
Ottawa, Arnprior and Parry Sound Railway
Ottawa, Arnprior and Renfrew Railway
Ottawa and Parry Sound Railway
Ottawa, Rideau Valley and Brockville Railway
Ottawa Terminals Railway
Oxford and Port Austin Railroad

P
Pacific, Northern and Omineca Railway
Parry Sound Colonization Railway
Pembina Valley Railway
Pembroke Southern Railway
Peninsular Railroad
Peninsular Railway
Peninsular Railway - Illinois
Peninsular Railway - Indiana
Peninsular Railway - Michigan
Peninsular Railway Extension Company
Peterborough and Chemong Lake Railway
Peterborough and Port Hope Railway
Petitcodiac and Elgin Branch Railway
Pleasant Bay Railway
Polk and 49th Street Junction Railway
Pontiac, Oxford and Northern Railroad
Pontiac, Oxford and Port Austin Railroad
Port Arthur, Duluth and Western Railway
Port Dalhousie, St. Catharines and Thorold Electric Street Railway
Port Dalhousie and Thorold Railway
Port Dover and Lake Huron Railway
Port Hope, Lindsay and Beaverton Railway
Port Huron and Indiana Railway
Port Huron and Lake Michigan Railroad
Port Huron and Milwaukee Railway
Port Huron Railroad Tunnel Company
Port Whitby and Port Perry Railway
Portage and North-Western Railway
Portland Elevator Company
Prescott County Railway
Preston and Berlin Junction Railway
Preston and Berlin Railway
Prince Edward County Railway
Prince Edward Island Car Ferry Terminals
Prince Edward Island Ferry Service
Prince Edward Island Railway
Prince Charles
Prince David
Prince George
Prince Henry
Prince John
Prince Robert
Prince Rupert Dry Dock and Shipyard
Prince Rupert Hotel Site
Prince Rupert
Prince William
Public Markets
Pullin and Copp
Pullin, Virgil and Company's Express

Q
Qu'Appelle, Long Lake and Saskatchewan Railroad and Steamboat Company
Quebec Bridge Company
Quebec Bridge and Railway
Quebec and Gosford Railway
Quebec and James Bay Railway
Quebec and Lake St. John Railway
Quebec, Montmorency and Charlevoix Railway
Quebec, Montreal, Ottawa and Occidental Railway
Quebec, Montreal and Southern Railway
Quebec, New Brunswick and Nova Scotia Railway
Quebec Oriental Railway
Quebec Railway Bridge Company
Quebec Railway, Light and Power Company
Quebec and Richmond Railroad
Quebec and Saguenay Railway
Quebec Southern Railway
Queen Elizabeth Hotel

R
Rail and River Coal Company
Rainy River Bridge Company
Railroad Credit Corporation
Railway Express Agency, Incorporated
Realty Assets Company
Red River Valley Railway
Reid Newfoundland Company
Restigouche and Victoria Colonization Railway
Restigouche and Victoria Railway
Restigouche and Western Railway
Rouyn Mines Railway
Rutland and Burlington Railroad
Rutland Railroad

S
Saguenay and Lake St. John Railway
St. Boniface Western Land Company
St. Catharines, Merritton and Thorold Street Railway, Company
St. Catharines and Niagara Centre Railway
St. Catharines Street Railway
St. Charles and Huron River Railway
St. Clair Frontier Tunnel Company
St. Clair Tunnel Company
Saint John and Quebec Railway Bridge Company
Saint John and Quebec Railway
Saint John and Quebec Railway Trust Company
Saint John Valley Railway
Saint John's Dry Dock
Saint Joseph Valley Railway
St. Lawrence and Atlantic Railroad
St. Lawrence, Lower Laurentian and Saguenay Railway
St. Lawrence and Ottawa Grand Junction Railroad
St. Louis, Richibucto and Buctouche, Railway
Saint Martin's Railway
Saint Martin's and Upham Railway
Saint Maurice Railway and Navigation Company
Salisbury and Albert Railway
Salisbury and Harvey Railway. Company
Saratoga and St. Lawrence Railroad
Saskatchewan and North Western Railway
Saskatchewan Bridge Company
Saskatchewan Midland Railway
Saskatchewan North Western Railway
Shawinigan Falls Terminal Railway
Societe Immobiliere de la Rue Scribe
South Chicago and Western Indiana Railroad
South Norfolk Railway
South Shore Railway
Southern New England Railway
Southern New England Railway
Southern Vermont Railway
Stanstead, Shefford and Chambly Railroad
Stratford and Huron Railway
Street Railway Construction Company
Sydney Transfer and Storage

T
Temiscouata Railway
Terminal Warehouse and Cartage Company
Terminal Warehouse Registered
Terminal Warehouse Company
Thousand Islands Railway
Terra Transport
Thunder Bay Colonization Railway
Toledo and Ottawa Beach Railway
Toledo Railway and Terminal Company
Toledo, Saginaw and Mackinaw Railroad
Toledo, Saginaw and Muskegon Railway
Toledo Terminal Railroad
Toronto Belt Line Railway
Toronto Dwellings
Toronto Eastern Railway
Toronto and Goderich Railway
Toronto and Guelph Railway
Toronto and Hamilton Railway
Toronto, Niagara and Western Railway
Toronto and Nipissing Eastern Extension Railway
Toronto and Nipissing Railway
Toronto and Ottawa Railway
Toronto - Peterborough Transport Company
Toronto, Simcoe and Lake Huron Railroad Union Company
Toronto, Simcoe and Muskoka Junction Railway
Toronto Suburban Railway
Toronto Suburban Street Railway
Toronto Terminals Railway
Transcontinental Townsite Company

U
United Counties Railway
United States and Canada Railroad
United States and Canada Railway
United States Social Security Legislation

V
Vale Coal, Iron and Manufacturing Company
Vale Railway
Van Buren Bridge Company
Vancouver Dock
Vancouver Hotel Company
Vancouver Terminal Railway
Vancouver, Victoria and Eastern Railway and Navigation Company
Vermont and Canada Railroad
Vermont Central Railroad
Vermont and Massachusetts Railroad
Vermont and Province Line Railroad
Victoria Bridge
Victoria Dock
Victoria Hotel Site
Victoria Railway

W
Wacos Holdings
Waskada and North Eastern Railway
Waterloo Junction Railway
Welland Railway
Wellington and Georgian Bay Railway
Wellington, Grey and Bruce Railway
West River Railroad
Western Extension Railway
Western Union Telegraph Company
Western Vermont Railroad
Weston, High Park and Toronto Street Railway (Limited)
Whipple Car Company
Whitby and Port Perry Extension Railway
Whitby, Port Perry and Lindsay Railway
Windsor and Hantsport Railway
Winnipeg Great Northern Railway
Winnipeg and Hudson Bay Railway
Winnipeg and Hudson's Bay Railway and Steamship Company
Winnipeg Land Company
Winnipeg and Northern Railway
Winnipeg Transfer Railway (Limited)

Y
York and Carleton Railway

See also
CNR Radio

References
List of companies included in the Canadian National Railways, from CN Synoptical History of Organization, Capital Stock, Funded Debt and Other General Information (1962)

 
Canadian National
Canadian National
Canadian National
Canadian National
Lists of corporate subsidiaries